Joseph Brennan Haley (October 16, 1913 – May 1997) was a Canadian athlete who competed in the 1936 Summer Olympics. He was born in Red Islands, Nova Scotia and lived in Pictou, Nova Scotia, before he moved to Trail, British Columbia at age 12.

In 1936 he finished twelfth in the Olympic high jump event. At the 1934 British Empire Games he won the silver medal in the high jump competition, losing a 'jump-off' for the gold medal against Edwin Thacker of South Africa. Four years later he finished sixth in the high jump contest at the 1938 Empire Games. Joe Haley held the Canadian high jump record.  A track oval in Warfield, British Columbia was named in his honor.

References

1913 births
1997 deaths
People from Richmond County, Nova Scotia
Canadian male high jumpers
Olympic track and field athletes of Canada
Athletes (track and field) at the 1936 Summer Olympics
Athletes (track and field) at the 1934 British Empire Games
Athletes (track and field) at the 1938 British Empire Games
Commonwealth Games silver medallists for Canada
Commonwealth Games medallists in athletics
Sportspeople from Nova Scotia
Sportspeople from Trail, British Columbia
People with polio
20th-century Canadian people
Medallists at the 1934 British Empire Games